Laura A. Lopez is an associate professor of astronomy at Ohio State University studying the life cycle of stars.  She was awarded the Annie Jump Cannon Award in Astronomy in 2016, which is awarded by the American Astronomical Society (AAS) for outstanding research and promise for future research by a postdoctoral woman researcher.

Early life and education
Lopez is originally from Barrington, Illinois, a northwest suburb of Chicago, and graduated from Barrington High School in 2000.  She received her undergraduate degree from Massachusetts Institute of Technology in 2004.  Lopez earned her PhD in astronomy and astrophysics from the University of California Santa Cruz in 2011.  After completing her PhD she was an Einstein Fellow and Pappalardo Fellow in Physics at Massachusetts Institute of Technology (2011–2014).  Following that, she was a Hubble Fellow at the Center for Astrophysics  Harvard & Smithsonian (2014–2015).

Career
Lopez has contributed to the field of the life cycle of stars.  She has used the NuSTAR X-ray satellite to study Tycho's Supernova remnant. Using optical, infrared, radio, and X-ray images, she measured the pressures exerted on the remnant shells from direct stellar radiation, dust-processed radiation, warm ionized gas, and hot X-ray-emitting gas.

Lopez has used data acquired from various observatories to show that Supernova Remnant (SNR) 0104–72.3 in the Small Magellanic Cloud arose from a jet-driven bipolar core-collapse supernova.

Using the Advanced CCD Imaging Spectrometer on board the Chandra X-ray Observatory, Lopez observed the Galactic supernova remnant (SNR) W49B to understand the thermodynamic properties and explosive origin of the SNR. The observed electron temperature and absorbing column toward W49B suggest that the mean metal abundances are consistent with the predicted yields in models of bipolar/jet-driven core-collapse SNe.  W49B is thus likely a bipolar Type Ib/Ic SN, making it the first of its kind to be discovered in the Milky Way.

Lopez is interested in diversity in astronomy and is an advocate of the LGBTIQ astronomical community.  Additionally, she has previously served on the AAS Committee on the Status of Minorities in Astronomy (CSMA).

Awards 
 2016 - Annie Jump Cannon Award by American Astronomical Society 
 2019 - Cottrell Scholar Award by Research Corporation for Science Advancement

References

Living people
Ohio State University people
People from Barrington, Illinois
Massachusetts Institute of Technology alumni
Recipients of the Annie J. Cannon Award in Astronomy
Year of birth missing (living people)